Nikolaj Nikolaevich Nikolaenko (born 29 January 1978) is a retired Russian badminton player. In 2013, he won Hellas International tournament in men's doubles event with his partner Nikolai Ukk.

Achievements

European Junior Championships
Boys' singles

BWF Grand Prix 
The BWF Grand Prix has two level such as Grand Prix and Grand Prix Gold. It is a series of badminton tournaments, sanctioned by Badminton World Federation (BWF) since 2007. The World Badminton Grand Prix sanctioned by International Badminton Federation since 1983.

Men's Doubles

Mixed Doubles

 BWF Grand Prix Gold tournament
 BWF Grand Prix tournament

BWF International 
Men's Doubles

Mixed Doubles

 BWF International Challenge tournament
 BWF International Series tournament
 BWF Future Series tournament

References

External links
 

1978 births
Living people
Sportspeople from Novosibirsk
Russian male badminton players